WION (1430 kHz, "I-1430") is a commercial full-service AM radio station licensed to serve Ionia, Michigan. The station is owned by Packer Radio WION, LLC and features a mix of locally programmed music, news, and sports. WION transmits in C-QUAM AM stereo.

History

WION began broadcasting on February 1, 1953. It originally operated during daytime hours only with 500 watts.

The station was granted a construction permit by the FCC on August 14, 1961 to increase power from 500 watts to 5,000 watts and install a directional antenna. The FCC granted the station a new license with the upgraded facilities on October 1, 1964.

The FCC granted the station a new license effective May 23, 1995 allowing for nighttime operation with 330 watts using a directional antenna. On April 30, 2007, the FCC granted a construction permit to reduce daytime power from 5,000 watts to 4,700 watts and change from a directional to a non-directional antenna. No changes were to be made to nighttime facilities. The FCC granted the station a new license with the updated facilities on November 11, 2009.

In 2009, the station added an FM translator on 92.7 MHz purchased from Horizon Christian Fellowship, which changed frequencies from its original 103.7 MHz. The translator moved to the station's studios on Haynor Road in Ionia and covers all of Ionia County.

WION added FM Translator W262DN in Lowell, Michigan in 2019 to serve Eastern Kent County and the City of Lowell. It operates from the (Lowell)  City-owned tower and shares a broadcast antenna with the Lowell Area Schools' LPFM station. 

WION began online streaming of its programming on February 1, 2013 on the 60th anniversary of the station's first airdate.

Translators
WION programming is broadcast on the following translators:

References

External links
Michiguide.com - WION History 

ION
Adult hits radio stations in the United States
Radio stations established in 1953